Daytripper is a ten-issue American comic book limited series by Fábio Moon and Gabriel Bá, published by the DC Comics imprint Vertigo.

Resume
Brás de Oliva Domingos, the protagonist of the story, is the son of Benedito, an internationally renowned writer. He dreams to become one himself, but spends a good part of his early career writing the obituaries for a local newspaper. Only in his free time does he pursue his dream of being a novelist, which finally leads to the release of his first book. During the course of the ten episodes, however, the reader witnesses important days in Brás' life, including the challenges he is facing: travel, family, relationship, childhood, fatherhood. Each episode ends in a different version of him dying, all addressing the big questions of 'what is the meaning of life?' and 'what do you want to do with your life?'

Collected editions
The series has been collected into a trade paperback:
 Daytripper (256 pages, Titan Books, March 2011, DC Comics, February 2011)
 Daytripper (272 pages, Titan Books, March 2011, DC Comics, April 2014)

Reception
The trade paperback went into The New York Times Paperback Graphic Books chart at #1 in February 2011, and returned to the chart at the same position in mid-March, where it stayed for a week, before dropping to #2 the following week.

Daytripper was selected as the 2014 Life of the Mind book at the University of Tennessee (UT) in Knoxville. The Life of the Mind program at UT is a common reading program for all incoming first-year students. Daytripper is the first graphic novel and the first Brazilian work to be selected for the program.

It is often named among the best graphic novels of the modern era. Prominent reviewer GoodOKBad gave it a perfect 3-star rating and praised the art and emotion that is brought along with the characters.

Brazilian influences
Daytripper presents many Brazilian influences regarding language, literature and culture. The most predominant influence in the book is the main character's first name. The name "Bras" can be seen as a reference to the country Brazil, where Daytrippers creators were born, since this name is composed of the first four letters of the country written in Portuguese, "Brasil".

This name can also be perceived as a reference to one of the most famous characters in Brazilian literature, Brás Cubas. Such character appeared in Memórias Póstumas de Brás Cubas (The Posthumous Memoirs of Bras Cubas), by Brazilian author Machado de Assis. In an interview with "A Filanctera", a Brazilian blog about illustrations, Bá and Moon explained that the character "is a homage, a homage that makes sense because Bras's father is a very famous writer. The kind of father that would give his children the name of novel's characters. And also because Bras dies, and Brás Cubas dies as well". In both stories the characters are narrating the story of their deaths: while Bras Cubas makes it clear to the reader that he is already dead and is telling the story of his life, Bras de Oliva Domingos dies unexpectedly in many different ways at the end of each chapter.

Another Brazilian influence found in Daytripper is regarding the use of Portuguese language. In chapter 3, when Bras dies hit by a delivery truck, an important saying is written in it: "Foda. entregas". This translates is "Fuck. delivery", which could be perceived as a reference to the situation experienced by the main character, dying moments after seeing "...the woman he was going to spend the rest of his life with".

In addition to language and literature, Brazilians' behaviour regarding family is also depicted in Daytripper. In chapter 5, during which Bras and his parents visit his grandparents in the countryside, all the family is reunited: cousins, uncles, aunts. The act of getting the entire family united every weekend is a common tradition in Latin America, in which the value of family is highly considered. According to Clutter and Nieto: "Traditionally, the Hispanic family is a close-knit group and the most important 5 social units. The term familia usually goes beyond the nuclear family. The Hispanic 'family unit' includes not only parents and children but also extended family". Although Brazil is not a Hispanic country (being colonized by Portugal from 1500 to 1822), this custom is found in many Latin countries, from Latin America to the European colonizer ones (Porgual, Spain, Italy and France).

Another big influence of Brazilian culture in the graphic novel is related to food. In chapter 5, when the entire family is united to eat lunch, the dishes are all traditional in Brazilian cuisine. That basic meal consists of "rice and beans, potatoes, lettuce, — all very simple and homemade — but lunch always felt like a loud happy feast... Chicken was the kids' favorite dish, so grandma always cooked it". The basis of Brazilian lunches and dinners are chicken, lettuce, tomatoes, and potatoes. In accordance with Botelho:
"Beyond the regional differences, the daily dish eaten on almost all tables of the country is the duo rice with beans, accompanied by a salad, some kind of meat and manioc flour. The Aurélio dictionary of the Portuguese language defines the duo feijão-com-arroz (beans with rice) as 'of everyday use; common; usual'. It is a true element of national identity, which embraces the people from North to South".

Daytripper also describes Brazilians' culture regarding soap operas. In chapter 5, when Bras says, "Grandma named the chickens after characters from her soap operas", the great influence of this type of show in Brazilian people is depicted. While in some countries movies or TV series are the most watched television program, in Brazil soap operas are by far the most famous type of program. According to Brazilian Business, "Rede Globo soap operas are really famous and it happens inside and outside the country. There are some other broadcasters that advertise their programs saying 'After the Globo's soap opera, switch to our channel'".

Awards
 2011:
 Won "Best Limited Series or Story Arc" Eisner Award
 Won "Best Single Issue or Story" Harvey Award
 Won "Favourite New Comicbook" Eagle Award

Notes

References

External links
 Daytripper on Moon and Bá's blog
 Daytripper on Vertigo's blog
 Daytripper #1 review, Comic Book Resources
 Tennessee Today article

Harvey Award winners for Best Single Issue or Story
Comics set in Brazil
Brazilian graphic novels